Ridgewood is a census-designated place (CDP) in Hamilton County, Ohio, United States, adjacent to the city of Cincinnati. It was first listed as a CDP prior to the 2020 census.

The CDP is in eastern Hamilton County, in Columbia Township. It is bordered to the south by the Pleasant Ridge neighborhood of Cincinnati, to the north and east by the village of Amberley, and to the west by the village of Golf Manor.

Demographics

References 

Census-designated places in Hamilton County, Ohio
Census-designated places in Ohio